Thomas Alexander Gentles  (31 May 1934 – 29 June 2011) was a South African rugby union player.

Playing career
Gentles was educated at Diocesan College (Bishops) and the University of Cape Town, where he gained a B.A. degree.

Gentles made his test match debut for  against Robin Thompson's British Lions side in 1955 at Ellis Park on 6 August 1955, in front of over 90,000 fans. He toured with the Springboks to Australia and New Zealand in 1956. Gentles and Popeye Strydom competed for the scrumhalf position and consequently played in two of the six Tests, during the tour. He also played in 12 tour matches and scored three tries.

Test history

See also
List of South Africa national rugby union players – Springbok no. 316

References

1934 births
2011 deaths
South African rugby union players
South Africa international rugby union players
Alumni of Diocesan College, Cape Town
University of Cape Town alumni
Western Province (rugby union) players
Rugby union players from Johannesburg
Rugby union scrum-halves